Ice is an American television series created by Robert Munic. The project, set to air in late 2016 on Audience Network was ordered straight-to-series with an order of 10 episodes on August 2, 2016. The project was originally ordered in 2014 but was dropped for creative reasons. The series was then released on November 16, 2016. On June 16, 2017, the series was renewed for a second season.

On July 30, 2018, the series' cancellation was confirmed via a comment from the show's official Facebook page.

Plot

Season One
The series follows the lives of a Los Angeles diamond traders family business called Green & Green Diamond after recent events where one of the patriarchs sons has killed a prominent diamond dealer, while his step-brother has to bail him out and save the family business. The Green family is however trapped between doing a clean and dirty business. On one end, a Sierra Leone native, diamond dealer and philanthropists have huge interests in working with Green & Green. She forcefully integrates herself into Green & Green by blackmailing Jake Green that she needs an account of $25 million or Jake risks losing his daughter. As the season proceeds, the ailing cooperation between Isaac Green (Jake's father and the owner of Green & Green Diamond) weakens progressively and begins losing the appropriate mental judgement. Lady Rah continues blackmailing Jake into cooperating with her. This forces Jake and Bigfish to transport illegal diamonds over the border for a buyer who was willing to settle at an amount of $20 million. They lose the diamonds to one of Lady Rah trusted operatives, however Isaac succumbs to the pressure and in the process enters into a huge conflict with Cam Rose.

The two men struggle and Isaac collapses hitting his head really hard. He later dies in hospital after fading while on life support. After the will is read, it turns out that the Isaac split the shares of Green & Green equally to four people; His granddaughter (daughter to Jake and his ex-wife Ava Green), his two sons and his ailing sister, who happens to be Cam Rose's ex-wife. The will distribution greatly affects Cam expectations, as a result he embarks on a mission to capture the easiest 25%, that is from his wife. However, the 25% assigned to his granddaughter are assigned to Ava, her mother with custody. Jake continues trying to repay Lady Rah, however, in the meantime, Lady Rah's boss Peter appears.

Apparently, Peter is blackmailing Lady Rah by kidnapping her daughter. Lady Rah is in the process of using all her savings to save her daughter's life and return to Sierra Leone. Peter becomes relentless with Cam promises that he will use his supposed 25% to capture the Green & Green business. As such, he kidnaps Ava Green to get an opportunity to blackmail Jake into giving him the company by force. The FBI advances their case based on the taped information from Cam's office. Jake eventually settles for more dynamic terms of doing business while freeing his ex-wife from Peter. In the season finale, Freddy bumps into Peters new office at the Greens and finds Jake negotiating further terms of their contract. Lady Rah storms in with her security men and shoots Peter's guards. At the end, Jake is standing in the middle of Peter and Lady Rah's guns, waiting for a shooting opportunity.

Cast

Main

Recurring

Episodes

Season 1 (2016–17)

Season 2 (2018)

References

External links
 
 

English-language television shows
Television series by Entertainment One
Audience (TV network) original programming
2016 American television series debuts
2018 American television series endings
2010s American drama television series
American action television series